Aaron Jakubenko (born 8 December 1988) is an Australian actor. He is known for playing Yuri in Conspiracy 365 and Augie McTeer in Tidelands. He also played the main character of Commodus, based on the historical figure Commodus, in the Netflix-series Roman Empire's first season and one of the main characters in the American teen series titled The Shannara Chronicles.

Filmography

Television

Film

References

External links

1988 births
Living people
Male actors from Brisbane
Australian male television actors
Australian male film actors
21st-century Australian male actors